Nipane may refer to:

 Nipane, East Timor, Suco and village in East Timor
 Sapu, mountain in East Timor
 Nipane, Sindhuli, village in Sindhuli, Nepal
 Nipane, Rukum, village in Rukum, Nepal